Lepturges megalops is a species of longhorn beetle of the subfamily Lamiinae. It was described by Hamilton in 1896. It is a widespread neotropical species that can be found in Florida, the Bahamas, Guatemala, Honduras, and Panama.

The species is distinctive by its black integument and large eyes. It is typically 5–8 mm long.

References

Lepturges
Beetles described in 1896